Thomas Adolphus Trollope (29 April 1810 – 11 November 1892) was an English writer who was the author of more than 60 books. He lived most of his life in Italy creating a renowned villa in Florence with his first wife, Theodosia, and later another centre of British society in Rome with his second wife, the novelist Frances Eleanor Trollope. His mother, brother and both wives were known as writers. He was awarded the Order of Saints Maurice and Lazarus by Victor Emmanuel II of Italy.

Life
Trollope was born in Bloomsbury, London on 29 April 1810, the eldest son of Thomas Anthony and Frances Milton Trollope (a younger brother was Anthony Trollope, the novelist).  He was educated at Harrow School and Winchester College.  He first started writing before he went to Oxford University after a trip to New York with his father.  He matriculated at St Alban Hall, Oxford, in 1829, aged 19, and graduated B.A. from Magdalen Hall, Oxford, in 1835.  He taught briefly at Birmingham's King Edward's Grammar School, before he gave in to his mother's idea of forming a writing partnership.  They travelled to Italy which created some of the material for the 60 volumes of travel writing, history and fiction that he wrote that decade.  This was in addition to a large amount of periodical and journalistic work.

Trollope married twice; his first wife was the writer Theodosia Garrow who was staying with his mother, Fanny Trollope in Florence. The newly married couple had one daughter, Bice. Their home was visited by travelling British intelligentsia, as well as by leading Italian nationalist figures. They lived at the Villino Trollope on the square that was then called the Piazza Maria Antonio and what is now called the Piazza dell'Indipendenza in Florence. Their house was decorated with carved furniture, inlaid walls, majolica ceramics, marble floors and pillars, suits of armour and a 5,000-book library.

Their new villa was bought in part with Theodosia's inheritance. Their house was considered the centre of the expatriate society in Florence. Theodosia was known for her poetry, her translations and her articles on household matters, although she also contributed letters to the Athenaeum advocating freedom for Italy.

The Trollopes' daughter played with Pen, the son of Robert and Elizabeth Browning, when they too became part of the Anglophone society in 1847. Comparisons of the two households showed the Browning household as more intense, with the Trollopes more carefree. All of her guests were in danger of appearing, in some disguised way, in his mother's novels.

His second wife was the novelist Frances Eleanor Ternan whom he married on 29 October 1866: they then lived at the Villa Ricorboli. From 1873 the new couple again created a house known for its hospitality, but this time in Rome. Trollope lived in Italy for most of his adult life, but retired to Devon, England, in 1890. He died at Clifton, near Bristol, on 11 November 1892. His memoirs, What I Remember, were published in three volumes between 1887 (vols. 1 & 2) and 1889 (vol. 3).

Selected works
 Beppo The Conscript
 Dream Numbers
 Garstang Grange
 Gemma
 Leonora Casaloni
 Marietta
 The Sealed Packet

References

External links
 Brief online biography
 
 
 

1810 births
1892 deaths
19th-century English novelists
People from Bloomsbury
English travel writers
19th-century English historians
Historians of the Catholic Church
People educated at Harrow School
People educated at Winchester College
Recipients of the Order of Saints Maurice and Lazarus
English male novelists
19th-century male writers